David Scott (born 1932) is a former American astronaut.

David Scott may also refer to:

Arts and entertainment
 David Scott (painter) (1806–1849), Scottish painter
 David Scott (art historian) (1916–2009), American artist and art historian
 David Scott (poet) (1947–2022), English priest, poet, playwright and spiritual writer
 Scotty (reggae vocalist) or David Scott (1950–2003), Jamaican reggae musician
 David Scott (author) (born 1961), American author
 David Scott (Pearlfishers) (born 1964), leader of Scottish pop group Pearlfishers
 David Scott (born 1988), South African musician and music producer known as The Kiffness
 David Scott (21st century), American developer of computer game Flash Element TD and co-founder of the "Casual Collective"

Politics
 David Scott (of Scotstarvit) (1689–1766), Scottish politician
 David Scott (of Dunninald) (1746–1805), Scottish merchant, director of East India Company, Member of Parliament 1790–1805
 Sir David Scott, 2nd Baronet (1782–1851), British Member of Parliament for Yarmouth
 David Scott (Pennsylvania politician), U.S. Representative for Pennsylvania 1816–1817
 David Scott (Tasmanian politician) (1837–1893), Australian politician, member of the Tasmanian House of Assembly
 David Lynch Scott (1845–1924), Canadian militia officer, lawyer, and judge
 David Scott (Australian politician) (1848–1927), Australian politician, member of the New South Wales Legislative Assembly
 Sir David Aubrey Scott (1919–2010), British diplomat
 David Scott (Georgia politician) (born 1945), U.S. Representative for Georgia

Sports
 David Scott (gymnast) (1874–1959), Scottish gymnast
 David Scott (footballer) (born 1955), Australian rules footballer
 David Scott (rugby league) (born 1993), Scottish rugby league player
 David Scott (cricketer) (born 1998), English cricketer

Other
 David Scott (Royal Navy officer) (1921–2006), Royal Navy officer
 David Scott (priest) (1924–1996), English priest, Archdeacon of Stow
 David Meerman Scott (born 1961), American online marketing strategist and author
 David Scott (headmaster), Australian educationalist
 David Scott, director of Small Axe Project for Caribbean intellectual and artistic work
 , several vessels of that name

See also
 Dave Scott (disambiguation)